Mangalore Lok Sabha constituency was one of the Lok Sabha constituencies in Karnataka state in southern India. With the implementation of the delimitation of parliamentary constituencies in 2008, based on the recommendations of the Delimitation Commission of India constituted in 2002, this constituency ceased to exist.

Assembly segments
After the delimitation (2008), Dakshina Kannada Lok Sabha constituency replaced the Mangalore Lok Sabha constituency. As of 2019 Dakshina Kannada Lok Sabha constituency comprises the following Legislative Assembly segments: 
 Mangalore North
 Mangalore South
 Mangalore (Ullal) 
 Sullia
 Puttur
 Bantwal
 Mudabidre
 Belthangady

Arrangement in 1950s
Mangalore Lok Sabha Constituency was a part of South Kanara (South) Lok Sabha constituency of Madras State.  That seat came into existence in 1951 when South Kanara District (comprising present Dakshina Kannada District of Karnataka and Kasargod, Kanhangad Taluks of Kerala). With the implementation of States Reorganisation Act, 1956, it ceased to exist.

South Kanara (South) Lok Sabha constituency comprised the following six Legislative Assembly segments:
1) Panamangalore (Panemangalore), 2) Mangalore, 3) Kasargod, 4) Hosdurg (Kanhangad), 5 and 6) Two Puttur seats

After South Kanara District of erstwhile Madras State got merged with Mysore State in 1956, South Kanara (South) Lok Sabha constituency ceased to exist and was replaced by Mangalore Lok Sabha constituency. The Parts of Kasargod and Hosdurg (Kanhangad) were merged with Kerala and became a part of Kasaragod Lok Sabha constituency.

Members of Parliament

Election results

See also
 Dakshina Kannada Lok Sabha constituency
 South Kanara (South) Lok Sabha constituency
 Kodagu district
 List of former constituencies of the Lok Sabha

References

Dakshina Kannada district
Former constituencies of the Lok Sabha
2008 disestablishments in India
Constituencies disestablished in 2008
Former Lok Sabha constituencies of Karnataka